Canadian Interuniversity Sport (CIS) and the CCA combined to host the first national curling championship hosted by the University of Waterloo. It was held from March 12 to 16, 2008 at the Guelph Curling Club and Elora Curling Club.

The inaugural event for the men and women was won by the Wilfrid Laurier Golden Hawks.

Men's tournament 

In men's play the top teams after pool play were:

 Lakehead Thunderwolves
 Brock Badgers
 Laurier Golden Hawks
 Queen's Golden Gaels
 Calgary Dinos

Women's tournament 

In women's play the top teams after pool play were:

 Brock Badgers
 Manitoba Bisons
 Saint Mary's Huskies
 Laurentian Lady Vees
 Calgary Dinos

In the end the Golden Hawks swept to victory in both division. Especially impressive were the female Hawks who started out 0-3 and then won 7 in a row to claim victory.

See also
Curling
Canadian Curling Association
University and college curling
2009 Winter Universiade

References

2008 in Canadian curling
2008 in Ontario